Stuart D. Bascombe (born January 20, 1954) is an American singer, songwriter, musician, and record producer. Bascombe is an original member of the R&B/soul vocal group Black Ivory who recorded a number of R&B hits in the 1970s, including "Don't Turn Around", "You and I", "Time Is Love", "I'll Find a Way (The Loneliest Man in Town)", and their disco hit "Mainline".

Early life 
Bascombe was born in Harlem, New York City, and was raised in Harlem and in the Bronx.

History

Career 
Bascombe, along with songwriter and prolific disco producer Leroy Burgess, and Russell Patterson released their debut album while still attending High School. Black Ivory was first signed to the East Coast label Today/Perception Records, which was run by record producer, Patrick Adams, who was also the group's manager.

Bascombe with his group scored 3 top 40 R&B hits in 1972, including "Don't Turn Around" No. 38, and "You And I" No. 32  from their hit debut album, "Don't Turn Around", which peaked at No. 13 on the Billboard R&B Album Chart in May 1972. Bascombe is credited as co-writer on four songs from that album. Another single from that album, "I'll Find A Way (The Loneliest Man In Town)" peaked at No. 46 on Billboard R&B Chart. Their single, "Time Is Love" was the third top 40 hit peaking at No. 37. Other charting singles included, "Spinning Around" #45, "What Goes Around (Comes Around)" #44, and "Will We Ever Come Together" #40. Although they recorded several uptempo tracks, such as "Big Apple Rock", "Walking Downtown (On A Saturday Night)", "What Goes Around (Comes Around)" and later, "Mainline" with Russell Patterson as lead singer (written by Burgess, but recorded after he left the group in 1977), they were primarily known for sweet soul ballads.

On June 1, 1974, Bascombe appeared on season three of Soul train and on PBS television show, SOUL! March 1, 1972, with his group Black Ivory.

In 1976, Bascombe scored the lead role as Moses in a made for TV children's film "Turkey Treasure" which aired on WABC 7. In 1983, Bascombe again reprising the lead role as Moses in the WABC-TV Children's Special, "To Be A Man" which was produced by Neema Barnette and Cliff Frazier. The production won an Emmy for Best Children's Programming on April 23, 1983. Bascombe received a contributing Emmy plaque.

In 1995, the group reunited and returned to the stage on the Classic Soul circuit, featuring all three original members, with Stuart Bascombe doing most of the leads. They have been performing together ever since.

Bascombe is a contributing writer on Wu-Tang Clan rapper, Raekwon's single, Criminology off of his 1995 hit album "Only Built 4 Cuban Linx...". On October 2, 1995, the album was certified Gold by the RIAA.

Recent years 
Bascombe is a contributing writer on the single, "Gettin' Up" on Rapper and Musician Q-Tip's album, The Renaissance, which was nominated for Best Rap Album at the 52nd Annual Grammy Awards in 2010.

In 2011, Bascombe with his group released a Christmas single entitled "Snow", and a CD/album (which Bascombe co-produced and co-wrote three of the songs) entitled Continuum on their own label, SLR Records LLC.

Bascombe is a featured guest in the award-winning 2018 documentary, Mr. Soul! a film based on the host and executive producer of SOUL!, Ellis Haizlip, the first "black Tonight Show." In 1968, SOUL! was launched as a local, New York broadcast. In 1969 the series rolled out nationwide on PBS, on WNET Channel 13. Haizlip had produced over 130 hour-long shows featuring a dazzling array of A-list guests. Actor Blair Underwood is the Executive Director and narrator of the film.

In October 2019, Bascombe along with Black Ivory's band-mate, Russell Patterson traveled to the UK and joined Leroy Burgess on stage at the famous London's Jazz Cafe. It was the first time that Black Ivory performed in London together. They were honored with awards to commemorate their 50th Anniversary. In addition, Black Ivory was featured in a 13-page article in the London magazine, The Soul Survivors.

As of 2020, Bascombe is still writing and performing with his group Black Ivory, which are one of the only classic Soul/R&B groups from the 1970s, who are still performing with all of the original members from their first recordings.

Discography 
With Black Ivory

Albums 
Don't Turn Around (1972) (Today Records) No.13 Billboard R&B Chart
''Baby, Won't You Change Your Mind (1972) (Today Records) No.26 Billboard R&B Chart
Feel It (1975)  (Buddah Records)Black Ivory (1976) (Buddah Records)Hangin' Heavy (1979) (Buddah Records/Arista Records)Then and Now (1984) (Panoramic Records)Continuum'' (2011) (SLR Records)

Singles 
"Don't Turn Around" (1971) No.38 Billboard R&B Chart
"You and I" (1972) No.32 Billboard R&B Chart
"I'll Find a Way (The Loneliest Man In Town)"  (1972) No.46 Billboard R&B Chart
"Time Is Love"/"Got to Be There" (1972) No.37 Billboard R&B Chart
"Spinning Around" (1973) No.45 Billboard R&B Chart
"What Goes Around (Comes Around)" (1974) No.44 Billboard R&B Chart
"Will We Ever Come Together" (1975)  No.40 Billboard R&B Chart
"Daily News"
"You Mean Everything to Me"
"Walking Downtown (Saturday Night)" (1976)
"You Turned My Whole World Around" (1978)
"Mainline"/"Dance" (1979) No.57  Billboard Dance Club Chart
"You Are My Lover" (1984)
"I've Got My Eye On You" (1985) No.18 Billboard Dance Club Chart

References

External links 

 Stuart Bascombe Discogs
 Stuart Bascombe All Music Credits

1954 births
Living people
American male singer-songwriters
Record producers from New York (state)
American male film actors
American singer-songwriters